Anhui opera may refer to several distinct Chinese opera genres from Anhui province:

Hui opera, originally from southern Anhui
Huangmei opera, originally from southwestern Anhui, the most popular genre in Anhui
Lu opera, originally from central Anhui